William Bateman, 1st Viscount Bateman KB, FRS (1695 – December 1744), of Shobdon Court, Herefordshire was a British Whig politician who sat in the House of Commons between 1721 and 1734.

Bateman was the son of Sir James Bateman, of Shobdon Court, Shobdon, Lord Mayor of London and Governor of the Bank of England, by his wife Esther Searle, daughter of John Searle, of Finchley, Middlesex.

Bateman was returned as Member of Parliament for Leominster at a by-election in 1721 but did not stand at the 1722 general election. In 1725 he was raised to the Peerage of Ireland as Baron of Culmore, in the County of Londonderry, and Viscount Bateman. At the 1727 general election he was again elected to represent Leominster in parliament. In 1734 he was a candidate at Radnor instead, but was defeated and never stood for Parliament again.   He was made a Knight Companion of the Order of the Bath in 1732 and elected a Fellow of the Royal Society in 1733.

Lord Bateman married Lady Anne Spencer, daughter of Charles Spencer, 3rd Earl of Sunderland and Lady Anne Churchill, daughter of John Churchill, 1st Duke of Marlborough, in 1720. He died in Paris in December 1744 and was succeeded in the viscountcy by his son, John. Lady Bateman died in February 1769.

References

1695 births
1744 deaths
Alumni of Peterhouse, Cambridge
Members of the Parliament of Great Britain for English constituencies
British MPs 1715–1722
British MPs 1727–1734
Viscounts in the Peerage of Ireland
Peers of Ireland created by George I
Knights Companion of the Order of the Bath
Fellows of the Royal Society